Mobarakabad (also Romanized as Mobārakābād) is a village in Bazarjan Rural District, in the Central District of Tafresh County, Markazi Province, Iran. At the 2006 census, its population was 19, in 5 families.

References 

Populated places in Tafresh County